Rapsodia may refer to:
Rapsodia, album by pianist Gonzalo Rubalcaba
Rapsodia, album by Moldovan violinist Patricia Kopatchinskaja
"Rapsodia" (Mia Martini song), 1992
"Rapsodia" (Andrea Bocelli song) written by Zucchero
Rapsodia, a Bucharest-based musical instruments shop owned by the instrument maker Hora (company)

See also 
 Rhapsody (disambiguation)
 Rhapsodia, a 2005 video game